Disneymania 6 is the sixth installment in the Disneymania series. It features contemporary performers' takes on Disney songs. It was released on May 20, 2008.

Track listing

Singles
Selena Gomez - "Cruella de Vil"
Demi Lovato - "That's How You Know"
Colbie Caillat - "Kiss the Girl"
Billy Ray Cyrus - "Real Gone"

Music videos
If I Didn't Have You
Kiss the Girl
Cruella de Vil - used for the 101 Dalmatians Platinum Edition DVD 
Real Gone
That's How You Know (Live at the 2008 Disney Channel Games)

Charts

References

External links
Official Product Information (Disney.com)
Amazon.com

Disneymania albums
Walt Disney Records compilation albums
2008 compilation albums